The 2021–22 All-Ireland Junior B Club Hurling Championship was the 16th staging of the All-Ireland Junior B Club Hurling Championship since its establishment by the Killeedy GAA Club in 2005. It was the first championship to be completed in two years as the 2020–21 Championship was cancelled due to the COVID-19 pandemic.

The All-Ireland final was played on 2 April 2022 at Páirc Íde Naofa between Clonoulty-Rossmore and Cappataggle, in what was their first ever meeting in the final. Clonoulty-Rossmore won the match, after a replay, by 3–15 to 1–18 to claim their first ever All-Ireland title.

All-Ireland Junior B Club Hurling Championship

All-Ireland semi-finals

All-Ireland final

References

All-Ireland Junior B Club Hurling Championship
All-Ireland Junior B Club Hurling Championship
All-Ireland Junior Club Hurling Championship